Carex gynandra, also known as nodding sedge, is a species of flowering plant in the sedge family, Cyperaceae. It is native to eastern Canada and the United States.

See also
 List of Carex species

References

gynandra
Plants described in 1824
Flora of North America